Arpad Sterbik Capar (born 20 November 1979) is a retired handball player who represented the national teams of Yugoslavia (later known as Serbia and Montenegro) and Spain.

Internationally he has represented FR Yugoslavia (Serbia and Montenegro) and Spain, winning a World Championship bronze medal and one gold. On club level, he has league and cup titles both in Hungary and Spain, and most notably he won the EHF Champions League, the premier continental club competition in Europe. His performances were acknowledged several times, having been named Hungarian Handballer of the Year in 2002 and IHF World Player of the Year in 2005.

Career
Sterbik grew up by the nearby town of Ada. He began his career by RK Jugović, and moved to Hungary to play for Fotex KC Veszprém in 2001. Sterbik, as an ethnic Hungarian, could get the Hungarian citizenship in a simplified process just after few months, thus freeing a foreign player quota (that time Hungarian teams could have 2 foreign players in their match squad). It also made him available to play for the Hungarian national team, however, he never made an international appearance for Hungary. Sterbik remained in Veszprém until 2004, during which period he won three Hungarian league and as many Hungarian cup titles. In 2002 he reached with Veszprém the EHF Champions League final, just to fell short against SC Magdeburg with an aggregate score of 48–51. In the same year he was voted Hungarian Handballer of the Year.

In 2004 he moved to Spanish side BM Ciudad Real and soon became one of the most prominent keepers in the Liga ASOBAL. While playing for Ciudad Real (2004–2011) and its successor Atlético Madrid (2011–2012), he was named the best goalkeeper of the league five times in a row (2006–2010) and in 2006 he also got the Liga ASOBAL MVP Award. Additionally, he was awarded the IHF World Player of the Year title by the International Handball Federation in 2005.<ref>Previous World Handball Players (Retrieved on 26 January 2008)</ref> Sterbik spent seven seasons by Ciudad Real and won four Spanish league and two Spanish cup titles. He went successful with Ciudad Real in the EHF Champions League as well, having won the title three times. In 2008, in his fourth season in Spain, Sterbik has gained Spanish citizenship and decided to represent Spain on international level.

In 2012, after eight successful seasons in Ciudad Real and Atlético Madrid, Sterbik switched to league rivals FC Barcelona Handbol, having signed a four-year contract with the Catalan team.

On 14 June 2014, Sterbik has agreed to join RK Vardar from Macedonia. With this club, Sterbik won 2 titles in two years in the Macedonian Handball League as well as 2 Cup titles. In addition, with RK Vardar, in season 2014–2015, he managed to enter the quarter final of the EHF Champions League and to be part of the top 8 handball teams in Europe. In the same year, they finished fourth in Gazprom's SEHA League. In April 2016, they won the second place in the Final 4 tournament of the SEHA League (lost the final against Veszprem with 26–28). Sterbik has earned many individual awards with RK Vardar too. He was selected in the dream-team of the SEHA League for 2015–16, and also, he was recognized several times as a best goalkeeper of particular rounds of the EHF Champions League.

On international level Sterbik played for Yugoslavia and Spain; he received bronze medals at the 1999 World Championships and at the 2001 World Championships with Yugoslavia, and added another World Championship bronze and a gold with Spain to his medals tally in 2011 and 2013, respectively.

Personal life
Born in Senta, Serbia, at the time part of Yugoslavia, Sterbik is an ethnic Hungarian from Serbia who acquired Hungarian citizenship shortly after playing in Hungary and holds Spanish citizenship per post naturalization process.  

Sterbik is married to Hungarian economist Mónika Horváth. The couple has twin children, Laura and Noel (b. 2010). Arpad's sister, Andrea Sterbik is also a professional handballer who plays for Hungarian top division club Kiskunhalas NKSE.

Achievements
EHF Challenge Cup:Winner: 2001
Nemzeti Bajnokság I:Winner: 2002, 2003, 2004
Magyar Kupa:Winner: 2002, 2003, 2004
Liga ASOBAL:Winner: 2004, 2007, 2008, 2009, 2012, 2013, 2014
Copa del Rey:Winner: 2008, 2011, 2014
EHF Champions League:Winner'': 2006, 2008, 2009, 2017

Individual awards
Hungarian Handballer of the Year: 2002
IHF World Player of the Year: 2005
Liga ASOBAL MVP: 2006
Liga ASOBAL Goalkeeper of the Year: 2006, 2007, 2008, 2009, 2010

References

External links

1979 births
Living people
People from Senta
Hungarian male handball players
Spanish male handball players
Serbian male handball players
Serbian expatriate sportspeople in Spain
Serbian people of Hungarian descent
Spanish people of Hungarian descent
Spanish people of Serbian descent
Hungarians in Vojvodina
Liga ASOBAL players
BM Ciudad Real players
FC Barcelona Handbol players
Handball players at the 2012 Summer Olympics
Olympic handball players of Yugoslavia
Yugoslav male handball players
Handball players at the 2000 Summer Olympics
Olympic handball players of Spain
Veszprém KC players
People from Ada, Serbia
Spanish expatriate sportspeople in North Macedonia
RK Vardar players